Riktha is a 2017 Indian Kannada comedy horror film directed by debutante Amruth Kumar and produced by G. Arun Kumar. The film features Sanchari Vijay donning four different roles: a child, a lover, a drunkard and a comedian. Vagdevi Advika and Ramya Varshini also feature in the lead roles. The film's music is composed by Rocky Sonu and the cinematography is by Muralidhar.

Cast
 Sanchari Vijay
 Vagdevi Advika
 Ramya Varshini
 Madesh Neenasam
 Abhishek
 Jagadish 
 Prasad

Soundtrack
Debutante composer Rocky Sonu has composed for original score and soundtracks of the film. Actor Sanchari Vijay recorded his first song for the film.

References

External links

 official Facebook page
 #riktha hashtag on Twitter
 ‘Riktha’ looks at horror from a new, hilarious angle

2017 films
2017 horror films
2010s Kannada-language films
Indian comedy horror films
2017 comedy horror films
2017 comedy films